Warszawa Wola railway station is a railway station in the Wola district of Warsaw, Poland. It was built on the Warsaw orbital line, which goes through Warszawa Gdańska station. In 2011, it is used exclusively by Koleje Mazowieckie who run the KM9 services from Warszawa Zachodnia through the north of the Masovian Voivodeship to Działdowo, in the Warmian-Masurian Voivodeship via Legionowo, Nasielsk, Modlin, Ciechanów and Mława, at all of which some trains terminate.

The station was closed in March 2017 for the reconstruction of the railway line. Upon reopening in October 2018, its name was changed from Warszawa Kasprzaka to Warszawa Wola, taking the name previously used by a station merged in 2012 into the Warszawa Zachodnia railway station.

References

External links 
 Station article at kolej.one.pl
 

Wola
Railway stations served by Koleje Mazowieckie
Wola